Jason Maza  (born 24 April 1986) is an English actor, producer, director and screenwriter.

Career
Maza was accepted to the Central School of Speech and Drama, but at that time, he was already working as an actor so decided not to attend. Although primarily an actor, Maza began work as a film producer in 2011, setting up Think Big Productions. Since then he has produced 14 films. Titles include: 10x10 starring Luke Evans, and Brotherhood for Lionsgate which grossed just shy of £4,000,000 at the UK Box Office. Maza cites Ray Winstone as one of his favorite actors and biggest inspirations, "If you look what he has achieved, he started off as a working class British film actor to a big star in Hollywood. We’re from similar backgrounds as well as the same area so I suppose I can relate to him. If I have half the career he has I’ll be very happy".

In 2017, Maza teamed up with Noel Clarke, launching Unstoppable Film and Television as co-CEO, after working with him on the Universal Pictures Brit-comedy The Knot. In 2018, Unstoppable joined the All3Media Group, forming Unstoppable Film & Television. 
As part of Unstoppable, in 2020, Maza produced and starred in a loose adaptation of Oliver Twist, entitled Twist alongside Michael Caine, Rita Ora, Lena Headey and Rafferty Law.

Maza and Clarke were both suspended by All3Media Group in April 2021 after the sexual misconduct allegations against Clarke, and formally left the production company Unstoppable Film and Television later in the year. Filming of Sky One’s British police-drama Bulletproof, in which Maza was starring, was also cancelled.

Personal life

Maza lives in Essex. His younger brother, Taylor, is also an actor.

Credits

Film

Television

Theatre

References

External links 
 Jason Maza homepage
 Showreel
 
 

1987 births
Living people
21st-century English male actors
British people of Portuguese descent
English male film actors
English male stage actors
English male television actors
Film producers from London
Male actors from London